Mary Alicia Owen (1850?–1935) was a folklore collector of Missouri who compiled several works of local legend and voodoo.

She was born in a family of Saint Joseph, Missouri and lived with her two sisters, Luella and Juliette, both of whom were noted authors. She became inspired to record the disappearing folk tales after reading Algonquin Legends of New England, beginning a correspondence with Charles Godfrey Leland. Her earliest publication was Old Rabbit the Voodoo, and other Sorcerers, printed with an introduction by Leland, which was favourably reviewed in the English journal Folk-Lore; the reviewer, E. S. Hartland, dismisses Leland's request for consideration as a first work and says of it, "[f]rom the first page to the last there is not a dull page...".  Her researches and fieldwork had already been reported in a paper she read before the 1891 "Second International Folk-Congress" in London, which was printed in the Transactions of the conference as "Among the Voodoos".
Her principal work was Voodoo tales as told among the Negroes of the southwest,
Owen gave long service to The Missouri Folklore Society, serving as its President until the year of her death.

Owen also published articles in Century Magazine and Overland Monthly, writing as Julia Scott, and contributed reviews and journalism to other periodicals.

References

1935 deaths
American folklorists
Women folklorists
Collectors of fairy tales
People from St. Joseph, Missouri
Year of birth uncertain
American women journalists
Women science fiction and fantasy writers